Marit Elisabeth Mikkelsplass (born Marit Wold on 22 February 1965) is a former Norwegian cross-country skier who competed from 1985 to 1998. She represented Kjelsås IL in Oslo. Today she is married to former Norwegian cross-country skier Pål Gunnar Mikkelsplass.

Mikkelsplass has three silver medals from the Winter Olympics, earning them in the 30 km (1994) and the 4 × 5 km relay (1988, 1998). She also has three medals from the FIS Nordic World Ski Championships kraa two silvers (4 × 5 km relay: 1995, 1997) and a bronze (30 km: 1997).

Cross-country skiing results
All results are sourced from the International Ski Federation (FIS).

Olympic Games
 3 medals – (3 silver)

World Championships
 3 medals – (2 silver, 1 bronze)

World Cup

Season standings

Individual podiums
2 victories
11 podiums

Team podiums

 3 victories 
 18 podiums  

Note:   Until the 1999 World Championships and the 1994 Olympics, World Championship and Olympic races were included in the World Cup scoring system.

References

External links

1965 births
Living people
Norwegian female cross-country skiers
Cross-country skiers at the 1988 Winter Olympics
Cross-country skiers at the 1994 Winter Olympics
Cross-country skiers at the 1998 Winter Olympics
Olympic cross-country skiers of Norway
Olympic medalists in cross-country skiing
FIS Nordic World Ski Championships medalists in cross-country skiing
Medalists at the 1998 Winter Olympics
Medalists at the 1994 Winter Olympics
Medalists at the 1988 Winter Olympics
Olympic silver medalists for Norway
Skiers from Oslo